Henri Bernard may refer to:

 Henri Bernard (magistrate) (1899–1986), French magistrate and judge
 Henri Bernard (athlete) (1900–1967), French hurdler
 Henri Bernard (footballer) (1914–1942), Swiss footballer
  (1900–1987), Belgian military historian